Hong Kong Aircraft Engineering Company Limited (HAECO) is one of the world's leading independent aircraft engineering and maintenance groups with its head office located at Hong Kong International Airport. Established in 1950, the HAECO Group comprises 16 operating companies, employing around 15,000 staff in Hong Kong, Chinese Mainland, Europe and the United States. It is a member of the Swire Group. HAECO Group provides a comprehensive range of solutions encompassing airframe services, line services, cabin solutions, private jet solutions, fleet technical management, inventory technical management, component overhaul, aerostructure repairs, landing gear services, engine services, global engine support, parts manufacturing and technical training. 
 
Operating companies and business units under the HAECO Group are:   

 HAECO Hong Kong
 HAECO Xiamen
 HAECO Americas
 HAECO Cabin Solutions
 HAESL
 HAECO Global Engine Support
 HAECO ITM
 HAECO Component Overhaul
 HAECO Engine Services (Xiamen) 
 HAECO Composite Services
 HAECO Landing Gear Services
 STAECO
 HAECO Shanghai
 SMECO
 Goodrich Asia Pacific 
 Goodrich TAECO
 Honeywell TAECO
 Dunlop Taikoo

History
1950s 

HAECO was officially established in November 1950, following the merger of Pacific Air Maintenance and Supply Company (PAMAS) and Jardine Air Maintenance Company (JAMCo). 

1960s

HAECO was floated on the Hong Kong stock market in 1965. By then, it was fully equipped to service the Convair 880M introduced by Cathay Pacific Airways. In 1968, the company began the construction of Asia’s largest aircraft maintenance hangar.

1970s

HAECO broadened its capabilities to include widebody aircraft and jet engine types, such as the L1011 TriStar series equipped with Rolls-Royce RB211 engines. The company became an official member of the Swire Group when Swire Pacific increased its shareholding to 51% in 1975.

1980s

With HAECO’s high standards and rapid turnaround times on major overhaul contracts, HAECO saw increasing business from international airlines. The first aircraft conversion - upgrading a L1011-1 Tristar to a L1011-150 - was successfully completed during this period.

1990s

The 90s saw the formation of HAECO’s joint ventures, including TAECO in Xiamen (now HAECO Xiamen) and HAESL in Hong Kong. In 1998, HAECO relocated to a brand new HK$1.4 billion facility at the then-new Hong Kong International Airport (HKIA) in Chek Lap Kok.

2000s

HAECO Hong Kong expanded its facility with a second hangar and began work on its third. Additional MRO and component facilities were added in Xiamen and Jinjiang in the Chinese Mainland. TAECO (HAECO Xiamen) performed its first Boeing 747-200 passenger to all-freighter conversion, and in 2005 converted the world’s first 747-400 Boeing Converted Freighter for Cathay Pacific Airways.

2010s

In early 2014, HAECO acquired TIMCO Aviation Services (HAECO Americas) based in Greensboro, North Carolina, adding North America MRO airframe and cabin solutions to its portfolio. Additional operations were also launched in Hong Kong, Xiamen, Beijing, Shanghai, Chengdu, Tianjin, Nanjing, Chongqing, Zhengzhou, Wuhan, Harbin, Ningbo and Hangzhou. 

On 30 November 2018, HAECO became a wholly-owned subsidiary of Swire Pacific.

References

External links
HAECO Group Website

Swire Group
Aircraft engineering companies
Aerospace companies of Hong Kong
Former companies in the Hang Seng Index
Engineering companies of Hong Kong
Companies based in Greensboro, North Carolina
1950 establishments in Hong Kong